Eduardo Osorio is an author and journalist born in 1957 in Toluca, Mexico. His major work is the book Club Obrero, which deals with homosexuality and conservatism. On 2012, he published El juego del gato y el alfil, a novel winner of the Ignacio Manuel Altamirano contest prize from the Universidad Autónoma del Estado de México.

Biography 
Involved in the Journalist Youth Generation (Spanish, Generación de los periodistas niños) since 15, he worked in journalism for about 35 years, writing articles, caricatures, and editorials, and directing several newspapers. His most representative work was produced during the four years he worked for the newspaper El Sol de Toluca. He has won several awards for his articles and interviews, including the National Award for Journalism (El Premio Estatal de Periodismo). He lived in various places, including the Federal District of Mexico, Monterrey, Guanajuato, Guadalajara, and Chihuahua.

His first work was Stories for Suicides and Lovers (Cuentos para suicidas y enamorados). This was followed by Club Obrero: fantasticas nocturnidades en Chihuahua, inspired and influenced by the social and cultural tumult he witnessed as a journalist in Chihuahua and supported by a grant from the Toluca Center for Writers. He won the National Award for Literature (El Premio Nacional de Literatura) for his narrative The Year that the Devils Were Crowned (El año en que se coronaron los diablos). He has also written plays, including Einstein Against the Pirate of the Fifth Dimension; essays, such as Batalla por el Eco y el Aire; and poetry.

He has been the coordinator of the Toluca Center for Writers since 1997.

His Work

Narrative 
 Club Obrero: fantasticas nocturnidades en Chihuahua.
 Batalla por el Eco y el Aire.
 Historias Megalopolitanas
 El Año en que se Coronaron los Diablos.
 Cuentos breves para suicidas y enamorados 
 El Enigma Carmen

Poetry 
 El patio de mi casa 
 Bromas para mi padre

Other 
 Theater: Einstein contra el pirata de la quinta dimension 
 Essay: Batalla por el Eco

References 

1957 births
Living people
Mexican journalists
Male journalists
People from Toluca